John of Cologne (Joannes van Hoornaar),  was a friar and priest of the  Dominican Order, born in the Electorate of Cologne, part of modern Germany. He later became a parish priest of Hoornaar, in the Spanish Netherlands. He was executed for his faith in 1572 and has been declared a martyr and saint by the Catholic Church.

Background
In the period 1550-1560 the Dutch Provinces were trying to gain their independence from the Spanish empire of King Philip II.

The Geuzen (Sea Beggars) were adventurers, pirates and patriots who fought against the Spanish rule in the Dutch provinces. For several years their bases of operation included the ports of Emden (on the coast of the Dutch Province Friesland), La Rochelle (on the coast of France) and Dover (on the coast of England). The Sea Beggars attacked vessels of almost any nation as well as fishing villages and towns on the coast of the Dutch Provinces.

Life
All that is known of John's early life is that he attended the University of Cologne, then recognized as one of the best educational institutions in Europe. He entered the Dominican Order at Cologne and received his formation there. After completing his education, John was assigned to a parish in the Netherlands village of Hoornaar, where he served for the next twenty years.

By 1572, Lutheranism and Calvinism had spread through a great part of Europe. In the Netherlands this was followed by a struggle between the two denominations in which Calvinism was victorious. On 1 April of that year Calvinists and a group called the Watergeuzen (Sea Beggars) conquered Brielle (Den Briel) and later Flushing. In June of that year, Dordrecht and Gorkum also fell into their hands. There they arrested all the Catholic clergy and held them in confinement, in an attempt to get them to deny the Catholic beliefs on the Eucharist and papal primacy.

As John became aware of what had happened to his fellow priests, he disguised himself and attempted to bring them the comfort of the sacraments. He secretly ministered to the captives but was eventually found out and also taken captive. These nineteen were imprisoned in Gorkum from June 26 until July 6, undergoing much abuse. Meanwhile, a letter from William the Silent, Prince of Orange, enjoined all those in authority to leave priests and religious unmolested. Nevertheless Lumey, the commander of the Watergeuzen, ordered them to be hanged on the night of 9 July, in a turfshed, after cruel tortures.

They are referred by the Roman Catholic Church as the Martyrs of Gorkum.

The group was canonized by Pope Pius IX in 1867. Their remains are honored at a shrine built to their honor in Brielle.

Notes

References
 Patron Saints Index: Blessed Pope Pius IX

Further reading

16th-century births
1572 deaths
People from the Electorate of Cologne
University of Cologne alumni
German Dominicans
16th-century German Roman Catholic priests
Executed people from North Rhine-Westphalia
German people executed abroad
Burials in South Holland
Martyred Roman Catholic priests
German Roman Catholic saints
Dominican martyrs
Dominican saints
People executed by the Netherlands by hanging